François Jauffret defeated Željko Franulović 3-6, 6-2, 6-4, 6-3 to win the 1969 Buenos Aires tennis tournament singles competition. Roy Emerson was the defending champion.

Draw

Final

Section 1

Section 2

External links
 ITF tournament edition details

Singles
ATP Buenos Aires